Môj malý príbeh is the second solo album by Marika Gombitová released on OPUS in 1981.

Track listing

Official releases
 1981: Môj malý príbeh, LP, MC, OPUS, #9113 1149
 1995: Môj malý príbeh, CD, re-release, Open Music #0025 2331
 2001: Môj malý príbeh: Komplet 2, 3 bonus tracks, CD, Sony Music Bonton, #50 4534
 2004: Môj malý príbeh: Komplet 2, 3 bonus tracks, CD, OPUS, #91 1149
 2008: Môj malý príbeh: 2CD Collectors Edition, bonus CD, OPUS, #91 2792

Credits and personnel

 Marika Gombitová - lead vocal, writer
 Ján Lehotský - lead vocal, writer
 Ján Lauko - writer, producer
 Pavol Hammel - writer
 Kamil Peteraj - lyrics

 Jozef Hanák - sound direction
 Peter Procházka - photography
 Ali Brezovský - writer (bonus tracks 12-15, Bonus CD)
 Dežo Ursiny - writer (bonus tracks 16-22, Bonus CD) 
 Ján Štrasser - lyrics (bonus tracks 16-22, Bonus CD)

References

General

Specific

External links 
 

1981 albums
Marika Gombitová albums